Cameron James Goode (born April 15, 1998) is an American football linebacker for the Miami Dolphins of the National Football League (NFL). He played college football at California.

College career
Goode was a member of the California Golden Bears for six seasons and redshirted his true freshman season. Goode finished his college career with 171 tackles, 36.5 tackles for loss, and 21.5 sacks.

Professional career
Goode was selected by the Miami Dolphins in the seventh round, 224th overall, of the 2022 NFL Draft. He was waived by the Dolphins on August 30, 2022 and re-signed to the practice squad. He signed a reserve/future contract on January 16, 2023.

References

External links
 Miami Dolphins bio
California Golden Bears bio

Living people
1998 births
California Golden Bears football players
Miami Dolphins players
American football linebackers
Players of American football from Texas
Sportspeople from Harris County, Texas
People from Spring, Texas